The women's 100 metres hurdles event at the 2017 European Athletics U23 Championships was held in Bydgoszcz, Poland, at Zdzisław Krzyszkowiak Stadium on 14 and 15 July.

Medalists

Results

Heats
14 July

Qualification rule: First 3 (Q) and the next 4 fastest (q) qualified for the semifinals.

Wind:Heat 1: +0.2 m/s, Heat 2: +0.7 m/s, Heat 3: +1.1 m/s, Heat 4: +0.5 m/s

Semifinals

15 July

Qualification rule: First 3 (Q) and the next 2 fastest (q) qualified for the final.

Wind:Heat 1: +0.8 m/s, Heat 2: +0.3 m/s

Final
15 July

Wind: +2.3 m/s

References

100 metres hurdles
Sprint hurdles at the European Athletics U23 Championships